Jacques Landry (27 September 1911 – 24 November 1976) was a Canadian ski jumper. He competed in the individual event at the 1932 Winter Olympics.

References

1911 births
1976 deaths
Canadian male ski jumpers
Olympic ski jumpers of Canada
Ski jumpers at the 1932 Winter Olympics
Skiers from Ottawa